Forgetting Sarah Marshall is a 2008 American  comedy film directed by Nicholas Stoller and starring Jason Segel, Kristen Bell, Mila Kunis and Russell Brand. The film, which was written by Segel and co-produced by Judd Apatow, was released by Universal Pictures. Filming began in April 2007 at the Turtle Bay Resort on the North Shore of Oahu Island in Hawaii. The film was released for North American theaters on April 18, 2008, and in the United Kingdom a week later on April 25, 2008.

The story revolves around Peter Bretter, who is a music composer for a TV show that happens to feature his girlfriend, Sarah Marshall, in the lead role. After a five-year relationship, Sarah abruptly breaks up with Peter. Devastated by this event, he chooses to go on vacation to Hawaii, in order to try to move forward with his life. Trouble ensues when he runs into his ex on the island as she is on vacation with her new boyfriend.

Plot
Composer Peter Bretter is in a five-year relationship with actress Sarah Marshall, who stars in a CSI-like television show titled Crime Scene: Scene of the Crime. One day, as Peter stands stark naked in their apartment, Sarah abruptly announces that she is breaking up with him. Devastated and unable to banish his grief through one-night stands, Peter, against the advice of his ex-stepbrother and best friend Brian, takes a trip to Hawaii and stays at Turtle Bay resort. However, the vacation is ruined when he learns that Sarah and her new British rock star boyfriend Aldous Snow are also guests of the resort. Taking pity on him, hotel concierge Rachel Jansen offers him an incredibly expensive suite for free in exchange for cleaning up the room himself.

Peter begins spending time with Rachel and starts to develop feelings for her. Meanwhile, the relationship between Sarah and Aldous begins to falter. Much of the discord is triggered by the news that Sarah's TV show has been cancelled and that Aldous is about to embark on a world tour with his rock group, Infant Sorrow, for 18 months. Peter is later forced to move to the room next to Sarah's after Dakota Fanning and her team book the suite. During a day of surf and sand, Aldous and Peter run into each other and begin talking. Inadvertently, Aldous informs Peter that he and Sarah began having sex a full year before she broke up with Peter. When Peter confronts Sarah, she tells him she began feeling disconnected emotionally from him, and she couldn't do anything to make their relationship work. Further exacerbating the situation is Sarah's obvious jealousy of the budding relationship between Peter and Rachel, while Peter (through observing Sarah's relationship with Aldous) begins to realize that his relationship with her wasn't as great as he remembered.

Sarah, Aldous, Peter, and Rachel share an awkward dinner. After dinner, Peter takes Rachel back to his hotel room, and they begin to have sex. Sarah hears them through the wall and initiates sex with Aldous, moaning loudly for the benefit of the couple next door, and Rachel and Peter turn the situation into a competition and become even louder. When Aldous realizes Sarah is clearly putting on a performance to provoke a reaction from Peter, he pushes her off and tells her the trip was a mistake as she's clearly not over Peter. They bicker furiously, prompting Aldous to announce that the relationship is over and that he has been cheating on her. The next day, Peter encounters Aldous and learns that he and Sarah have broken up and that he is returning to England alone. He and Peter part amicably. Peter goes to Sarah's room to console her, where she admits she is still in love with him and tries to rekindle their romance. The two start to engage in sexual activity, but Peter is unable to achieve an erection due to his ambivalent feelings towards Sarah, despite her performing oral sex on him. He realizes that he has become much happier with Rachel and berates Sarah for treating him badly in the first place. Peter immediately goes to Rachel to confess what happened, but she is hurt and demands that he leave and never contact her again. Before leaving, Peter takes down a picture of Rachel flashing her breasts that is on the wall of the men's room at a local bar. He  returns it to her, fulfilling her wish,  despite enduring a beat-down from the bar's owner.

He flies back to Los Angeles and, after a period of sadness and self-loathing, begins working on his Dracula puppet comedy-rock opera, A Taste for Love. He sends an invitation to Rachel for the opening night performance. Although hesitant at first, Rachel eventually decides to attend. After the successful performance, Rachel congratulates Peter and tells him she's looking into attending college in the area. She leaves so Peter can bask in the success of his show, but quickly returns to Peter's dressing room to tell him she misses him, where she finds him stark naked, just as he was when Sarah dumped him. The film ends with a mid-credits promo of  Sarah starring in a new television show titled Animal Instincts where she plays a character who can read animals' minds, meaning that she couldn't fulfill her dream of being a movie star and is still working on critically panned projects.

Cast

Puppeteers
The puppets seen in the film were created by Jim Henson's Creature Shop. The following animate the puppets in this film:

Production
Stoller stated that Judd Apatow was very involved in the casting process and the development of the script. Regarding the nudity in the film, Stoller added that the first draft of the script called for Peter to get dressed after the breakup, but Apatow thought it would be funnier if the character stayed naked the entire time. Stoller confirmed the picture of Mila Kunis used in the film was created on a computer and not real.

Filming
Filming was completed in Hawaii and Los Angeles. While filming, lead actor Jason Segel told a New York Times interviewer that the naked breakup scenes were based on a real-life experience he had. The film features a great deal of improvised dialogue; according to director Nicholas Stoller, it's "60 or 70 percent scripted and then 30 or 40 percent improv".

Music
Segel and Lyle Workman wrote music for the film, which includes music by Infant Sorrow and a song from the Dracula musical. Eric Carmen, Blondie, and Kenny Loggins were also used in previews for the film.

Soundtrack

The soundtrack of Forgetting Sarah Marshall was released on April 22, 2008.

Several songs are featured in the film that were not included on the soundtrack, including "Heaven Knows I'm Miserable Now" by The Smiths and the version of "Nothing Compares 2 U" by Sinéad O'Connor, both of which are heard in the background during the scene in which Peter's brother deletes all of Peter's photos.  "Amber" by 311 can be heard in the background during the bar scene after Peter and Rachel's first date, as well as "Playa Azul" from Los Amigos Invisibles. "Move Your Feet" by Junior Senior is briefly played in background in the scene at the beginning when they are showing Access Hollywood clips. Another song not featured on the soundtrack is "Heavy Lifting" from New York band Ambulance Ltd.

Release
The film was promoted with a "teaser" billboard campaign, featuring the text "I hate Sarah Marshall" and the address of the film's website.

In its opening weekend, the film grossed $17.7 million in 2,798 theaters in the United States and Canada, ranking No. 2 at the box office behind The Forbidden Kingdom, and averaging $6,335 per theater in the US and per theater in Canada. It opened behind other Apatow productions such as Superbad, Knocked Up, The 40-Year-Old Virgin and Talladega Nights, but ahead of contemporary Apatow films Walk Hard and Drillbit Taylor.

Forgetting Sarah Marshall grossed $105.8 million worldwide; $63.2 million in North America and $42.6 million in other territories.

Home media
The DVD and Blu-ray editions were released on September 30, 2008. At the DVD sales chart, Forgetting Sarah Marshall opened at #2 and sold 652,000 units, translating to $12,905,492 in revenue. As of (November 2009) 1,785,744 DVD units have been sold, acquiring revenue of $29,145,295. This does not include Blu-ray sales/DVD rentals.

It was released in a single-disc DVD edition, a three-disc collector's DVD edition, a two-disc Blu-ray edition, and the Ultimate Unrated Comedy Collection containing the collectors' editions of Forgetting Sarah Marshall, The 40-Year-Old Virgin, and Knocked Up on either DVD or Blu-ray Disc. It was released on DVD in Australia (region 4) on August 20, 2008 in a single and 2-Disc Unforgettable Edition and was also released on Blu-ray in Australia on November 5, 2008.

Reception
Forgetting Sarah Marshall received positive reviews from critics. Review aggregator Rotten Tomatoes reports that 83% of 185 critics have given the film a positive review, with a rating average of 7.00/10. The site's consensus reads, "With ample laughs and sharp performances, Forgetting Sarah Marshall finds just the right mix of romantic and raunchy comedy." Metacritic reported the film had an average score of 67 out of 100, based on 37 reviews. Audiences surveyed by CinemaScore gave the film a grade B on scale of A to F.

Matt Pais of the Chicago Tribune said it's "the kind of movie you could watch all day because, like a new flame, you can't get enough of its company and are just glad to see where it takes you." Richard Roeper praised the film for its laugh-out-loud moments as well as its worthiness to be an instant classic and went as far as to say he would put it on his list of 50 favorite comedies of all time.

Other positive reviews come from Entertainment Weekly who gave the film a B+ and applauded "Jason Segel's riff on varieties of male bewilderment," and Mick LaSalle of the San Francisco Chronicle, who wrote "Segel's breakthrough movie, Forgetting Sarah Marshall, deserves to ride the wave of the latest, hottest micro-trend in pictures: the romantic comedy for guys."

Awards and nominations
Forgetting Sarah Marshall was nominated for five awards at the 2008 Teen Choice Awards, but did not win any of them. The nominations were:
 Movie, Bromantic Comedy
 Movie, Actress Comedy: Kristen Bell
 Movie, Breakout Female: Kristen Bell
 Movie, Breakout Female: Mila Kunis
 Movie, Breakout Male: Jason Segel

On The Comedy Festival Presents: Funniest Movies of the Year 2008 on TBS, Forgetting Sarah Marshall was voted "The Funniest Film of 2008".

Follow-up spin-off

Get Him to the Greek is the spin-off/follow-up to Forgetting Sarah Marshall. The film was released on June 4, 2010, reuniting director Nicholas Stoller and producer Judd Apatow with stars Russell Brand and Jonah Hill. Brand reprises his role of Aldous Snow, while Hill plays an entirely new character. Bell also briefly reprises her role as Sarah Marshall, appearing in a promotion for NBC drama Blind Medicine where she portrays a visually impaired surgeon.

References

External links

 
 
 
 

2008 films
2000s English-language films
2008 romantic comedy-drama films
American romantic comedy-drama films
American sex comedy films
Films about vacationing
Films directed by Nicholas Stoller
Films produced by Judd Apatow
Films scored by Lyle Workman
Films set in Hawaii
Films set in hotels
Films set on beaches
Films shot in Hawaii
Films with screenplays by Jason Segel
Apatow Productions films
Universal Pictures films
2000s sex comedy films
2008 directorial debut films
2008 comedy films
2000s American films